CM Scientific English High School is a school in Imphal West district of Manipur, India. It is situated at Iramsiphai Leirak Ashangba. The Chandreshwor Memorial Scientific English High School came into existence in 1995. It was founded by Chongtham Kober Singh. Presently Yurembam Kameshwor Singh is working as Principal. Chongtham Kunjo Singh is working as Secretary of School Management Committee. The school had celebrated its Silver Jubilee Foundation Ceremony on 12 October 2019.

References 

High schools and secondary schools in Manipur
Imphal West district
Educational institutions established in 1995
1995 establishments in Manipur